The Parliament of Australia (officially the Federal Parliament, also called the Commonwealth Parliament) is the legislative branch of the government of Australia. It consists of three elements: the monarch (represented by the governor-general), the Senate and the House of Representatives. The combination of two elected chambers, in which the members of the Senate represent the states and territories while the members of the House represent electoral divisions according to population, is modelled on the United States Congress. Through both chambers, however, there is a fused executive, drawn from the Westminster system.

The upper house, the Senate, consists of 76 members: twelve for each state, and two each for the territories, Northern Territory (including Christmas Island and the Cocos (Keeling) Islands) and the Australian Capital Territory (including Norfolk Island and the Jervis Bay Territory). Senators are elected using the single transferable vote proportional representation system and as a result, the chamber features a multitude of parties vying for power. The governing party or coalition has not held a majority in the Senate since 1981 (except between 2005 and 2007) and usually needs to negotiate with other parties and Independents to get legislation passed.

The lower house, the House of Representatives, currently consists of 151 members, each elected using full-preference instant-runoff voting from single-member constituencies known as electoral divisions (and commonly referred to as "electorates" or "seats"). This tends to lead to the chamber being dominated by two major political groups, the centre-right Coalition (consisting of the Liberal and National Parties) and the centre-left Labor Party. The government of the day must achieve the confidence of this House in order to gain and remain in power.

The House of Representatives has a maximum term of three years, although it can be dissolved early. The Senate has fixed terms, with 36 Senators' terms expiring every three years (the terms of the four territory senators are linked to House elections). As a result, House and Senate elections almost always coincide. A deadlock-breaking mechanism known as a double dissolution can be used to dissolve the full Senate as well as the House if the Senate refuses to pass a piece of legislation passed by the House.

The two Houses meet in separate chambers of Parliament House (except in a rare joint sitting) on Capital Hill in Canberra, Australian Capital Territory.

History

Temporary home in Melbourne (1901–1927)
The Commonwealth of Australia came into being on 1 January 1901 with the federation of the six Australian colonies. The inaugural election took place on 29 and 30 March and the first Australian Parliament was opened on 9 May 1901 in Melbourne by Prince George, Duke of Cornwall and York, later King George V. The only building in Melbourne that was large enough to accommodate the 14,000 guests was the western annexe of the Royal Exhibition Building. After the official opening, from 1901 to 1927 the Parliament met in Parliament House, Melbourne, which it borrowed from the Parliament of Victoria (which sat, instead, in the Royal Exhibition Building until 1927).

Old Parliament House (1927–1988)

It had always been intended that the national Parliament would sit in a new national capital. This was a compromise at Federation due to the rivalry between the two largest Australian cities, Sydney and Melbourne, which both wished to become the new capital. The site of Canberra was selected for the location of the nation's capital city in 1908. A competition was announced on 30 June 1914 to design Parliament House, with prize money of £7,000. However, due to the start of World War I the next month, the competition was cancelled. It was re-announced in August 1916, but again postponed indefinitely on 24 November 1916. In the meantime, John Smith Murdoch, the Commonwealth's Chief Architect, worked on the design as part of his official duties. He had little personal enthusiasm for the project, as he felt it was a waste of money and expenditure on it could not be justified at the time. Nevertheless, he designed the building by default.

The construction of Old Parliament House, as it is called today, commenced on 28 August 1923 and was completed in early 1927. It was built by the Commonwealth Department of Works, using tradesmen and materials from all over Australia. The final cost was about £600,000, which was more than three times the original estimate. It was designed to house the parliament for a maximum of 50 years until a permanent facility could be built, but was actually used for more than 60 years.

The building was opened on 9 May 1927 by the Duke and Duchess of York (later King George VI and Queen Elizabeth The Queen Mother). The opening ceremonies were both splendid and incongruous, given the sparsely built nature of Canberra of the time and its small population. The building was extensively decorated with British Empire and Australian flags and bunting. Temporary stands were erected bordering the lawns in front of the Parliament and these were filled with crowds. A Wiradjuri elder, Jimmy Clements, was one of only two aboriginal Australians present, having walked for about a week from Brungle Station (near Tumut) to be at the event. Dame Nellie Melba sang the National anthem (at that time God Save the King). The Duke of York unlocked the front doors with a golden key, and led the official party into King's Hall where he unveiled the statue of his father, King George V. The Duke then opened the first parliamentary session in the new Senate Chamber.

New Parliament House (1988–present)

In 1978 the Fraser Government decided to proceed with a new building on Capital Hill, and the Parliament House Construction Authority was created. A two-stage competition was announced, for which the Authority consulted the Royal Australian Institute of Architects and, together with the National Capital Development Commission, made available to competitors a brief and competition documents. The design competition drew 329 entries from 29 countries.

The competition winner was the Philadelphia-based architectural firm of Mitchell/Giurgola, with the on-site work directed by the Italian-born architect Romaldo Giurgola, with a design which involved burying most of the building under Capital Hill, and capping the edifice with an enormous spire topped by a large Australian flag. The façades, however, included deliberate imitation of some of the patterns of the Old Parliament House, so that there is a slight resemblance despite the massive difference of scale. The building was also designed to "sit above" Old Parliament House when seen from a distance.

Construction began in 1981, and the House was intended to be ready by Australia Day,  1988, the 200th anniversary of European settlement in Australia. It was expected to cost . Neither the deadline nor the budget was met. In the end it cost more than A$1.1 billion to build.

The New Parliament House was finally opened by Elizabeth II, Queen of Australia, on  1988, the anniversary of the opening of both the first Federal Parliament in Melbourne on  1901 and the Provisional Parliament House in Canberra on  1927.

In March 2020, the 46th Parliament of Australia was suspended due to the COVID-19 pandemic in Australia; an adjournment rather than prorogation. Its committees would continue to operate using technology. This unprecedented move was accompanied by two motions raised by the Attorney-General of Australia, Christian Porter, and passed on 23 March 2020. One motion was designed to allow MPs to participate in parliament by electronic means, if agreed by the major parties and the speaker; the second determined that with the agreement of the two major parties, the standing orders could be amended without requiring an absolute majority.

Shortly before this, on 18 March, the Prime Minister formed a National Cabinet (the first in Australian history), composed of the Prime Minister and the premiers and chief ministers of the Australian states and territories, to coordinate the national response to the pandemic.

Composition and electoral systems

The Constitution establishes the Commonwealth Parliament, consisting of three components: the King of Australia, the Senate and the House of Representatives.

Monarch
Most of the constitutional functions of the Crown are given to the Governor-General, whom the King appoints on the advice of the Prime Minister to act as his representative in Australia.  However, by convention, the Governor-General usually exercises these powers only upon the advice of the Prime Minister.

Senate

The upper house of the Australian Parliament is the Senate, which consists of 76 members. Like the United States Senate, on which it was partly modelled, the Australian Senate includes an equal number of senators from each state, regardless of population. Unlike it, however, the Australian Senate has always been directly elected. (The US Senate has been directly elected only from 1913.)

The Constitution allows Parliament to determine the number of senators by legislation, provided that the six original states are equally represented. Furthermore, the Constitution provides that each original state is entitled to at least six senators. However, neither of these provisions applies to any newly admitted states, or to territories. Pursuant to an Act of Parliament passed in 1973, Senators are elected to represent the territories. Currently, the two Northern Territory Senators represent the residents of the Northern Territory as well as the Australian external territories of Christmas Island and the Cocos (Keeling) Islands. The two Australian Capital Territory Senators represent the Australian Capital Territory, the Jervis Bay Territory and since 1 July 2016, Norfolk Island. While only half of the State Senate seats go up for re-election each three years (except in the case of a double dissolution) as they serve six-year terms, all of the Territory Senators must face the voters every three years.

Until 1949, each state elected the constitutional minimum of six senators. This number increased to ten from the 1949 election, and was increased again to twelve from the 1984 election. The system for electing senators has changed several times since Federation. The original arrangement used a first-past-the-post block voting or "winner takes all" system, on a state-by-state basis. This was replaced in 1919 by preferential block voting. Block voting tended to produce landslide majorities and even "wipe-outs". For instance, from 1920 to 1923 the Nationalist Party had 35 of the 36 senators, and from 1947 to 1950, the Australian Labor Party had 33 of the 36 senators.

In 1948, single transferable vote proportional representation on a state-by-state basis became the method for electing senators. This change has been described as an "institutional revolution" that has led to the rise of a number of minor parties such as the Democratic Labor Party, Australian Democrats and Australian Greens who have taken advantage of this system to achieve parliamentary representation and the balance of power. From the 1984 election, group ticket voting was introduced in order to reduce a high rate of informal voting but in 2016, group tickets were abolished to avoid undue influence of preference deals amongst parties that were seen as distorting election results and a form of optional preferential voting was introduced.

In 1984, legislation was passed with the intention of changing the way long and short term seats are allocated following a double dissolution election, however the method has not been used, despite two bipartisan senate resolutions in favour of change.

Section 15 of the Constitution provides that a casual vacancy of a State Senator shall be filled by the State Parliament. If the previous Senator was a member of a particular political party the replacement must come from the same party, but the State Parliament may choose not to fill the vacancy, in which case Section 11 requires the Senate to proceed regardless. If the State Parliament happens to be in recess when the vacancy occurs, the Constitution provides that the State Governor can appoint someone to fill the place until fourteen days after the State Parliament resumes sitting. The State Parliament can also be recalled to ratify a replacement.

House of Representatives

The lower house of the Australian Parliament, the House of Representatives, is made up of single member electorates with a population of roughly equal size. As is convention in the Westminster system, the party or coalition of parties that has the majority in this House forms the Government with the leader of that party or coalition becoming the Prime Minister. If the government loses the confidence of the House, they are expected to call a new election or resign.

Parliament may determine the number of members of the House of Representatives but the Constitution provides that this number must be "as nearly as practicable, twice the number of Senators"; this requirement is commonly called the "nexus clause". Hence, the House presently consists of 151 members. Each state is allocated seats based on its population; however, each original state, regardless of size, is guaranteed at least five seats. The Constitution does not guarantee representation for the territories. Parliament granted a seat to the Northern Territory in 1922, and to the Australian Capital Territory in 1948; these territorial representatives, however, had only limited voting rights until 1968. Federal electorates have their boundaries redrawn or redistributed whenever a state or territory has its number of seats adjusted, if electorates are not generally matched by population size or if seven years have passed since the most recent redistribution.

From 1901 to 1949, the House consisted of either 74 or 75 members (the Senate had 36). Between 1949 and 1984, it had between 121 and 127 members (the Senate had 60 until 1975, when it increased to 64). In 1977, the High Court ordered that the size of the House be reduced from 127 to 124 members to comply with the nexus provision. In 1984, both the Senate and the House were enlarged; since then the House has had between 148 and 151 members (the Senate has 76).

First-past-the-post voting was used to elect members of the House of Representatives until in 1918 the Nationalist Party government, a predecessor of the modern-day Liberal Party of Australia, changed the lower house voting system to Instant-runoff voting, which in Australia is known as full preferential voting, as of the subsequent 1919 election.  (Labor had unexpectedly won the 1918 Swan by-election with the largest primary vote, due to vote splitting among the conservative parties.) This system has remained in place ever since, allowing the Coalition parties to safely contest the same seats. Full-preference preferential voting re-elected the Bob Hawke government at the 1990 election, the first time in federal history that Labor had obtained a net benefit from preferential voting.

Both Houses

It is not possible to be simultaneously a member of both the Senate and the House of Representatives, but a number of people have been members of both Houses at different times in their parliamentary career (see List of people who have served in both Houses of the Australian Parliament).

Only Australian citizens are eligible for election to either house. They must not also hold citizenship of a "foreign power". When the Constitution was drafted, all Australians were British subjects, so the word "foreign" meant non-British. But, in the landmark case Sue v Hill (1999), the High Court of Australia ruled that, at least since the Australia Act 1986, Britain has been a "foreign power", so that British citizens are also excluded.

Compulsory voting was introduced for federal elections in 1924. The immediate justification for compulsory voting was the low voter turnout (59.38%) at the 1922 federal election, down from 71.59% at the 1919 federal election. Compulsory voting was not on the platform of either the Stanley Bruce-led Nationalist/Country party coalition government or the Matthew Charlton-led Labor opposition. The actual initiative for change was made by Herbert Payne, a backbench Tasmanian Nationalist Senator who on 16 July 1924 introduced a private Senator's bill in the Senate. Payne's bill was passed with little debate (the House of Representatives agreeing to it in less than an hour), and in neither house was a division required, hence no votes were recorded against the bill. The 1925 federal election was the first to be conducted under compulsory voting, which saw the turnout figure rise to 91.4%. The turnout increased to about 95% within a couple of elections and has stayed at about that level since.

Since 1973, citizens have had the right to vote upon turning 18. Prior to this it was 21.

Australian Federal Police officers armed with assault rifles have been situated in the Federal Parliament since 2015. It is the first time in Australian history that a parliament has possessed armed personnel.

Procedure

Each of the two Houses elects a presiding officer. The presiding officer of the Senate is called the President; that of the House of Representatives is the Speaker. Elections for these positions are by secret ballot. Both offices are conventionally filled by members of the governing party, but the presiding officers are expected to oversee debate and enforce the rules in an impartial manner.

The Constitution authorises Parliament to set the quorum for each chamber. The quorum of the Senate is one-quarter of the total membership (nineteen); that of the House of Representatives is one-fifth of the total membership (thirty-one). In theory, if a quorum is not present, then a House may not continue to meet. In practice, members usually agree not to notice that a quorum is not present, so that debates on routine bills can continue while other members attend to other business outside the chamber. Sometimes the Opposition will "call a quorum" as a tactic to annoy the Government or delay proceedings, particularly when the Opposition feels it has been unfairly treated in the House. Proceedings are interrupted until a quorum is present. It is the responsibility of the government whip to ensure that, when a quorum is called, enough government members are present to form a quorum.

Both Houses may determine motions by voice vote: the presiding officer puts the question, and, after listening to shouts of "Aye" and "No" from the members, announces the result. The announcement of the presiding officer settles the question, unless at least two members demand a "division", or a recorded vote. In that case the bells are rung throughout Parliament House summoning Senators or Members to the chamber. During a division, members who favour the motion move to the right side of the chamber (the side to the Speaker's or President's right), and those opposed move to the left. They are then counted by "tellers" (government and opposition whips), and the motion is passed or defeated accordingly. In the Senate, in order not to deprive a state of a vote in what is supposed to be a states' house, the President is permitted a vote along with other senators (however, that right is rarely exercised); in the case of a tie, the President does not have a casting vote and the motion fails. In the House of Representatives, the Speaker does not vote, but has a casting vote if there is a tie.

Most legislation is introduced into the House of Representatives and goes through a number of stages before it becomes law. The legislative process occurs in English, although other Australian parliaments have permitted use of Indigenous languages with English translation. Government bills are drafted by the Office of Parliamentary Counsel.

The first stage is a first reading, where the legislation is introduced to the chamber, then there is a second reading, where a vote is taken on the general outlines of the bill. Although rare, the legislation can then be considered by a House committee, which reports back to the House on any recommendations. This is followed by a consideration in detail stage, where the House can consider the clauses of the bill in detail and make any amendments. This is finally followed by a third reading, where the bill is either passed or rejected by the House. If passed, the legislation is then sent to the Senate, which has a similar structure of debate and passage except that consideration of bills by Senate committees is more common than in the House and the consideration in detail stage is replaced by a committee of the whole. Once a bill has been passed by both Houses in the same form, it is then presented to the Governor-General for royal assent.

Functions

The principal function of the Parliament is to pass laws, or legislation. Any Senator or Member may introduce a proposed law (a bill), except for a money bill (a bill proposing an expenditure or levying a tax), which must be introduced in the House of Representatives. In practice, the great majority of bills are introduced by ministers. Bills introduced by other Members are called private members' bills. All bills must be passed by both Houses and assented to by the Governor-General to become law. The Senate has the same legislative powers as the House, except that it may not amend or introduce money bills, only pass or reject them. The enacting formula for Acts of Parliament is simply "The Parliament of Australia enacts:".

The Commonwealth legislative power is limited to that granted in the Constitution. Powers not specified are considered "residual powers", and remain the domain of the states. Section 51 grants the Commonwealth power over areas such as taxation, external affairs, defence and marriage. Section 51 also allows State parliaments to refer matters to the Commonwealth to legislate.

Section 96 of the Australian Constitution gives the Commonwealth Parliament the power to grant money to any State, "on such terms and conditions as the Parliament thinks fit". In effect, the Commonwealth can make grants subject to States implementing particular policies in their fields of legislative responsibility. Such grants, known as "tied grants" (since they are tied to a particular purpose), have been used to give the federal parliament influence over state policy matters such as public hospitals and schools.

The Parliament performs other functions besides legislation. It can discuss urgency motions or matters of public importance: these provide a forum for debates on public policy matters. Senators and Members can move motions on a range of matters relevant to their constituents, and can also move motions of censure against the government or individual ministers. On most sitting days in each House there is a session called Question time at which senators and members address questions without notice to the prime minister and other ministers. Senators and Members can also present petitions from their constituents. Both Houses have an extensive system of committees in which draft bills are debated, matters of public policy are inquired into, evidence is taken and public servants are questioned. There are also joint committees, composed of members from both Houses.

Conflict between the Houses

In the event of conflict between the two Houses over the final form of legislation, the Constitution provides for a simultaneous dissolution of both Houses – known as a double dissolution. Section 57 of the Constitution states that, "If the House of Representatives passes any proposed law, and the Senate rejects or fails to pass it, or passes it with amendments to which the House of Representatives will not agree, and if after an interval of three months the House of Representatives, in the same or the next session, again passes the proposed law with or without any amendments which have been made, suggested, or agreed to by the Senate, and the Senate rejects or fails to pass it, or passes it with amendments to which the House of Representatives will not agree, the Governor-General may dissolve the Senate and the House of Representatives simultaneously."

In an election following a double dissolution, each state elects their entire 12-seat Senate delegation, while the two territories represented in the Senate each elect their two senators as they would in a regular federal election. Because all seats are contested in the same election, it is easier for smaller parties to win seats under the single transferable vote system: the quota for the election of each senator in each Australian state in a full Senate election is 7.69% of the vote, while in a normal half-Senate election the quota is 14.28%.

If the conflict continues after such an election, the Governor-General may convene a joint sitting of both Houses to consider the bill or bills, including any amendments which have been previously proposed in either House, or any new amendments. If a bill is passed by an absolute majority of the total membership of the joint sitting, it is treated as though it had been passed separately by both Houses, and is presented for royal assent. With proportional representation, and the small majorities in the Senate compared to the generally larger majorities in the House of Representatives, and the requirement that the number of members of the House be "nearly as practicable" twice that of the Senate, a joint sitting after a double dissolution is more likely than not to lead to a victory for the House over the Senate. This provision has only been invoked on one occasion, after the election following the 1974 double dissolution. However, there are other occasions when the two Houses meet as one: see Joint meetings of the Australian Parliament.

Committees

In addition to the work of the main chambers, both the Senate and the House of Representatives have a large number of investigatory and scrutiny committees which deal with matters referred to them by their respective Houses or ministers. They provide the opportunity for all Members and Senators to ask questions of witnesses, including ministers and public officials, as well as conduct inquiries, and examine policy and legislation. Once a particular inquiry is completed the members of the committee can then produce a report, to be tabled in Parliament, outlining what they have discovered as well as any recommendations that they have produced for the Government or House to consider.

The ability of the Houses of Parliament to establish committees is referenced in Section 49 of the Constitution, which states that, "The powers, privileges, and immunities of the Senate and of the House of Representatives, and of the members and the committees of each House, shall be such as are declared by the Parliament, and until declared shall be those of the Commons House of Parliament of the United Kingdom, and of its members and committees, at the establishment of the Commonwealth."

Parliamentary committees can be given a wide range of powers. One of the most significant powers is the ability to summon people to attend hearings in order to give evidence and submit documents. Anyone who attempts to hinder the work of a Parliamentary committee may be found to be in contempt of Parliament. There are a number of ways that witnesses can be found in contempt, these include; refusing to appear before a committee when summoned, refusing to answer a question during a hearing or to produce a document, or later being found to have lied to or misled a committee. Anyone who attempts to influence a witness may also be found in contempt. Other powers include, the ability to meet throughout Australia, to establish subcommittees and to take evidence in both public and private hearings.

Proceedings of committees are considered to have the same legal standing as proceedings of Parliament, they are recorded by Hansard, except for private proceedings, and also operate under the protections of Parliamentary privilege. Every participant, including committee members and witnesses giving evidence, is protected from being prosecuted under any civil or criminal action for anything they may say during a hearing. Written evidence and documents received by a committee are also protected.

Types of committees include:

Standing Committees, which are established on an ongoing basis and are responsible for scrutinising bills and topics referred to them by the chamber or minister; examining the government's budget and activities (in what is called the budget estimates process); and for examining departmental annual reports and activities.

Select Committees, which are temporary committees, established in order to consider a particular matter. A select committee expires when it has published its final report on an inquiry.

Domestic Committees, which are responsible for administering aspects of the Parliament's own affairs. These include the Selection Committees of both Houses that determine how the Parliament will deal with particular pieces of legislation and private members’ business, and the Privileges Committees that deal with matters of parliamentary privilege.

Legislative Scrutiny Committees, which examine legislation and regulations to determine their impact on individual rights and accountability.

Joint Committees are also established to include both members of the House of Representatives and the Senate. Joint committees may be standing (ongoing) or select (temporary) in nature.

Relationship with the Government

Under the Constitution, the Governor-General has the power to appoint and dismiss "Ministers of State" who administer government departments. In practice, the Governor-General chooses ministers in accordance with the traditions of the Westminster system. The Governor-General appoints as Prime Minister the leader of the party that has a majority of seats in the House of Representatives; the Governor-General then, on the advice of the Prime Minister, appoints the other Ministers, chosen from the majority party or coalition of parties.

These ministers then meet in a council known as Cabinet. Cabinet meetings are strictly private and occur once a week where vital issues are discussed and policy formulated. The Constitution does not recognise the Cabinet as a legal entity; it exists solely by convention. Its decisions do not in and of themselves have legal force. However, it serves as the practical expression of the Federal Executive Council, which is Australia's highest formal governmental body. In practice, the Federal Executive Council meets solely to endorse and give legal force to decisions already made by the Cabinet. All members of the Cabinet are members of the Executive Council. While the Governor-General is nominal presiding officer, she or he almost never attends Executive Council meetings. The Governor-General is bound by convention to follow the advice of the Executive Council on almost all occasions, giving it de facto executive power. A senior member of the Cabinet holds the office of vice-president of the Executive Council and acts as presiding officer of the Executive Council in the absence of the Governor-General. The Federal Executive Council is the Australian equivalent of the Executive Councils and privy councils in other Commonwealth realms such as the King's Privy Council for Canada and the Privy Council of the United Kingdom.

A minister is not required to be a Senator or Member of the House of Representatives at the time of their appointment, but their office is forfeited if they do not become a member of either house within three months of their appointment. This provision was included in the Constitution (section 64) to enable the inaugural Ministry, led by Edmund Barton, to be appointed on 1 January 1901, even though the first federal elections were not scheduled to be held until 29 and 30 March.

After the 1949 election, John Spicer and Bill Spooner became ministers in the Menzies Government on 19 December, despite their terms in the Senate not beginning until 22 February 1950.

The provision was also used after the disappearance and presumed death of the Liberal Prime Minister Harold Holt in December 1967. The Liberal Party elected John Gorton, then a Senator, as its new leader, and he was sworn in as Prime Minister on 10 January 1968 (following an interim ministry led by John McEwen). On 1 February, Gorton resigned from the Senate to stand for the 24 February by-election in Holt's former House of Representatives electorate of Higgins due to the convention that the Prime Minister be a member of the lower house. For 22 days (2 to 23 February inclusive) he was Prime Minister while a member of neither house of parliament.

On a number of occasions when Ministers have retired from their seats prior to an election, or stood but lost their own seats in the election, they have retained their Ministerial offices until the next government is sworn in.

Role of the Senate

The Constitution of Australia established the Senate as part of the new system of dominion government in newly federated Australia. From a comparative governmental perspective, the Australian Senate exhibits distinctive characteristics. Unlike upper Houses in other Westminster system governments, the Senate is not a vestigial body with limited legislative power. Rather it was intended to play – and does play – an active role in legislation. Rather than being modelled solely after the House of Lords, as the Canadian Senate was, the Australian Senate was in part modelled after the United States Senate, by giving equal representation to each state. The Constitution intended to give less populous states added voice in a Federal legislature, while also providing for the revising role of an upper house in the Westminster system.

One of the functions of the Senate, both directly and through its committees, is to scrutinise government activity. The vigour of this scrutiny has been fuelled for many years by the fact that the party in government has seldom had a majority in the Senate. Whereas in the House of Representatives the government's majority has sometimes limited that chamber's capacity to implement executive scrutiny, the opposition and minor parties have been able to use their Senate numbers as a basis for conducting inquiries into government operations.

The constitutional text denies the Senate the power to originate or amend appropriation bills, in deference to the conventions of the classical Westminster system. Under a traditional Westminster system, the executive government is responsible for its use of public funds to the lower house, which has the power to bring down a government by blocking its access to supply – i.e. revenue appropriated through taxation. The arrangement as expressed in the Australian Constitution, however, still leaves the Senate with the power to reject supply bills or defer their passage – undoubtedly one of the Senate's most powerful abilities.

The ability to block supply was the origin of the 1975 Australian constitutional crisis. The Opposition used its numbers in the Senate to defer supply bills, refusing to deal with them until an election was called for both Houses of Parliament, an election which it hoped to win. The Prime Minister of the day, Gough Whitlam, contested the legitimacy of the blocking and refused to resign. The crisis brought to a head two Westminster conventions that, under the Australian constitutional system, were in conflict – firstly, that a government may continue to govern for as long as it has the support of the lower house, and secondly, that a government that no longer has access to supply must either resign or be dismissed. The crisis was resolved in November 1975 when Governor-General Sir John Kerr dismissed Whitlam's government and appointed a caretaker government on condition that elections for both Houses of parliament be held. This action in itself was a source of controversy and debate continues on the proper usage of the Senate's ability to block supply and on whether such a power should even exist.

The blocking of supply alone cannot force a double dissolution. There must be legislation repeatedly blocked by the Senate which the government can then choose to use as a trigger for a double dissolution.

Parliamentary departments
There are four parliamentary departments supporting the Australian Parliament:
Department of the Senate, which consists of seven Offices and whose work is determined by the Senate and its committees.
Department of the House of Representatives, which provides various services to support the smooth operation of the House of Representatives, its committees and certain joint committees.
Department of Parliamentary Services (DPS), which performs diverse support functions, such as research; the Parliamentary Library of Australia; broadcasting on radio and TV; Hansard transcripts; computing services; and general maintenance and security.
Parliamentary Budget Office (PBO), which "improves transparency around fiscal and budget policy issues" and provides costing services to parliamentarians.

Privileges
Members of the Australian Parliament do not have legal immunity: they can be arrested and tried for any offence. They do, however, have Parliamentary privilege: they cannot be sued for anything they say in Parliament about each other or about persons outside the Parliament. This privilege extends to reporting in the media of anything a Senator or Member says in Parliament. The proceedings of parliamentary committees, wherever they meet, are also covered by privilege, and this extends to witnesses before such committees.

From the beginning of Federation until 1987, Parliamentary privilege operated under Section 49 of the Constitution, which established the privileges of both Houses and their members to be the same as the House of Commons of the United Kingdom at the time of the Constitution's enactment. The Parliament was also given the power to amend its privileges. In 1987, the Parliament passed the "Parliamentary Privileges Act", which clarified the meaning and extent of privilege as well as how the Parliament deals with breaches.

There is a legal offence called contempt of Parliament. A person who speaks or acts in a manner contemptuous of the Parliament or its members can be tried and, if convicted, imprisoned. The Parliament previously had the power to hear such cases itself, and did so in the Browne–Fitzpatrick privilege case, 1955. This power has now been delegated to the courts. There have been few convictions. In May 2007, Harriet Swift, an anti-logging activist from New South Wales was convicted and reprimanded for contempt of Parliament, after she wrote fictitious press releases and letters purporting to be from Federal MP Gary Nairn as an April Fools' Day prank.

Broadcasting
Radio broadcasts of Parliamentary proceedings began on 10 July 1946. They were originally broadcast on Radio National. Since August 1994 they have been broadcast on ABC News, a government-owned channel set up specifically for this function. It operates 24 hours a day and broadcasts other news items when parliament is not sitting.

The first televised parliamentary event was the historic 1974 Joint Sitting. Regular free-to-air television broadcasts of Question Time began in August 1990 from the Senate and February 1991 from the House of Representatives. Question Time from the House of Representatives is televised live, and the Senate Question Time is recorded and broadcast later that day. Other free-to-air televised broadcasts include: the Treasurer's Budget speech and the Leader of the Opposition's reply to the Budget two days later; the opening of Parliament by the Governor-General; the swearing-in of Governors-General; and addresses to the Parliament by visiting heads of state.

In 2009, the Pay TV company Foxtel launched A-SPAN, now called Sky News Extra, which broadcasts live sittings of the House of Representatives and the Senate, parliamentary Committee meetings and political press conferences.

The Parliament House official website provides free extensive daily proceedings of both chambers as well as committee hearings live on the Internet.

Current parliament

The current Parliament is the 47th Australian Parliament. The most recent federal election was held on 21 May 2022 and the 47th Parliament first sat on 26 July.

The outcome of the 2022 election saw the Labor Party return to government for the first time in nine years, winning 77 seats in the 151-seat House of Representatives (an increase of 9 seats compared to the 2019 election), a majority government. The Liberal/National Coalition, which had been in power since the 2013 election, lost 19 seats compared to the previous election to finish with 58 seats, and went into opposition. The crossbench grew to its largest ever size, with 16 members; 4 Greens, 1 Centre Alliance MP, 1 Katter's Australian Party MP, and 12 independents.

In the Senate, the Labor government retained 26 seats, the Liberal/National Coalition dropped to 32 seats, the Greens increased to 12 seats, the Jacqui Lambie Network had 2 seats, One Nation had 2 seats, the United Australia Party won 1 seat, and independent David Pocock won 1 seat in the Australian Capital Territory.

Historical compositions

Senate
The Senate has included representatives from a range of political parties, including several parties that have seldom or never had representation in the House of Representatives, but which have consistently secured a small but significant level of electoral support, as the table shows.

Results represent the composition of the Senate after the elections. The full Senate has been contested on eight occasions; the inaugural election and seven double dissolutions. These are underlined and highlighted in puce.

House of Representatives
A two-party system has existed in the Australian House of Representatives since the two non-Labor parties merged in 1909. The 1910 election was the first to elect a majority government, with the Australian Labor Party concurrently winning the first Senate majority. Prior to 1909 a three-party system existed in the chamber. A two-party-preferred vote (2PP) has been calculated since the 1919 change from first-past-the-post to preferential voting and subsequent introduction of the Coalition. ALP = Australian Labor Party, L+NP = grouping of Liberal/National/LNP/CLP Coalition parties (and predecessors), Oth = other parties and independents.

See also
 2022 Australian federal election
 Chronology of Australian federal parliaments
 List of legislatures by country
 List of official openings by Elizabeth II in Australia
 Members of the Australian House of Representatives, 2022-2025
 Members of the Australian Senate, 2022-2025
 List of longest-serving members of the Parliament of Australia

Notes

References

Further reading

 
 
 
 
 
 
 Harry Evans, Odgers' Australian Senate Practice, A detailed reference work on all aspects of the Senate's powers, procedures and practices.
 B.C. Wright, House of Representatives Practice (6th Ed.), A detailed reference work on all aspects of the House of Representatives' powers, procedures and practices.

External links

Australian House of Representatives YouTube official channel 
 The Parliament of Australia's website
 The Australian Constitution from the Federal Register of Legislation
 Australian Parliament – live broadcasting
 Parliament of Australia Committees

 
Australia
Australia
Australia
Australia
1901 establishments in Australia